Ust-Katun is a rural locality (a settlement) in Biysky District, Altai Krai, Russia. The population was 449 as of 2013. There are 11 streets. The postal code for the city is 659374.

Geography 
Ust-Katun is located 13 km southwest of Biysk (the district's administrative centre) by road. Biysk is the nearest rural locality.

The highest altitude is 171 meters ( 561 ft. ) and it has a humid continental climate.

References 

Rural localities in Biysky District